Tapros is the trade name of two different drugs:

 Tafluprost, eye drops for the treatment of glaucoma
 Leuprorelin acetate, an anti-cancer drug